G-banding, G banding or Giemsa banding is a technique used in cytogenetics to produce a visible karyotype by staining condensed chromosomes. It is the most common chromosome banding method. It is useful for identifying genetic diseases (mainly chromosomal abnormalities) through the photographic representation of the entire chromosome complement.

Method
The metaphase chromosomes are treated with trypsin (to partially digest the chromosome) and stained with Giemsa stain. Heterochromatic regions, which tend to be rich with adenine and thymine (AT-rich) DNA and relatively gene-poor, stain more darkly in G-banding. In contrast, less condensed chromatin (Euchromatin)—which tends to be rich with guanine and cytosine (GC-rich) and more transcriptionally active—incorporates less Giemsa stain, and these regions appear as light bands in G-banding. The pattern of bands are numbered on each arm of the chromosome from the centromere to the telomere. This numbering system allows any band on the chromosome to be identified and described precisely. The reverse of G‑bands is obtained in R‑banding. Staining with Giemsa confers a purple color to chromosomes, but micrographs are often converted to grayscale to facilitate data presentation and make comparisons of results from different laboratories.

The less condensed the chromosomes are, the more bands appear when G-banding. This means that the different chromosomes are more distinct in prophase than they are in metaphase.

Advantage
It is difficult to identify and group chromosomes based on simple staining because the uniform colour of the structures makes it difficult to differentiate between the different chromosomes. Therefore, techniques like G‑banding were developed that made "bands" appear on the chromosomes. These bands were the same in appearance on the homologous chromosomes, thus, identification became easier and more accurate.

Types of banding
Other types of cytogenic banding are listed below:

See also

 Eukaryotic chromosome fine structure
 Gene mapping
 Fluorescence in situ hybridization

References 

Chromosomes
Staining